Bidarvaz (also Romanized as Bīdarvāz and  Beydarvāz; also known as Bahārvās, Beharwās, Biara, and Bīderbāz) is a village in Sirvan Rural District, Nowsud District, Paveh County, Kermanshah Province, Iran. At the 2006 census, its population was 52, in 24 families.

References 

Populated places in Paveh County